McHenry Hollow is a valley in Shannon County in the U.S. state of Missouri. It is a tributary to Spring Valley Creek.

McHenry Hollow has the name of the local McHenry family.

References

Valleys of Shannon County, Missouri
Valleys of Missouri